is a Japanese web manga series written and illustrated by One. It was serialized on Shogakukan's Ura Sunday website from April 2012 to December 2017. It has been also available online on Shogakukan's mobile app MangaONE since December 2014. Shogakukan compiled its chapters into sixteen tankōbon volumes. The story follows Shigeo Kageyama, nicknamed Mob, a boy who has strong psychic powers, and his struggles to find the simple happiness he is looking for.

An anime television series adaptation was produced by Bones. The first season aired between July and September 2016, followed by a second season from January to April 2019, and a third season from October to December 2022. A live-action series adaptation aired from January to April 2018. A spin-off manga series, titled Reigen, was serialized in Shogakukan MangaONE app in 2018. In North America, Dark Horse Comics licensed the manga for English publication in 2018. Meanwhile, Crunchyroll licensed the anime series for streaming, with an English dub produced by Bang Zoom! Entertainment in December 2016, and broadcast on Adult Swim's Toonami block in October 2018.

As of July 2016, the manga had over 1.2 million copies in circulation. In 2017, Mob Psycho 100 won the 62nd Shogakukan Manga Award in the shōnen category. The anime adaptation has been considered one of the best anime series of the 2010s.

Plot

Shigeo Kageyama is an average middle school-aged boy, nicknamed Mob. Although he looks like an inconspicuous person, he is in fact a powerful esper with immense psychic power. To keep from losing control of this power, he constantly lives a life under an emotional shackle. In order to help learn how to control his abilities, Mob works as an assistant to con-man Arataka Reigen, a self-proclaimed spirit medium. Mob wants to live a normal life just like those around him, but a barrage of trouble keeps coming after him. With his suppressed emotions growing inside Mob little by little, his power threatens to break through its limits as he eventually encounters other espers like the Claws.

Media

Webcomic and publications
Written and illustrated by One, Mob Psycho 100 began in Shogakukan's Ura Sunday webcomic magazine on April 18, 2012. It has been also available on Shogakukan's mobile app MangaONE since December 2014. The series finished on December 22, 2017. Shogakukan compiled its chapters into sixteen individual tankōbon volumes, released from November 16, 2012, to July 19, 2018.

Dark Horse Comics announced on April 23, 2018, that they have licensed the series for English serialization in North America, with the first volume which was released on October 24, 2018.

A spin-off manga series titled Reigen was serialized online in Ura Sunday website and in the MangaONE mobile app starting on March 19, 2018. Shogakukan released a compiled volume on February 19, 2019. In March 2020, Dark Horse Comics announced the acquisition of the manga for English-language release. The volume was published on December 2, 2020.

Volume list

|}

Anime

On December 2, 2015, Ura Sunday announced that Mob Psycho 100 would be adapted into an anime television series. The anime adaptation was produced by Bones and directed by Yuzuru Tachikawa. Hiroshi Seko wrote the scripts, Yoshimichi Kameda designed the characters, and Kenji Kawai composed the music. The series aired between July 12, 2016, and September 27, 2016, on Tokyo MX, later airing on ytv, BS Fuji and TV Asahi Channel 1. The opening theme song, "99", is performed by Mob Choir while the ending theme song, titled , is performed by All Off.

Mob Psycho 100 was simulcast on Crunchyroll, while Funimation broadcast the show's simuldub. The English dub was produced by Bang Zoom! Entertainment. The series was simulcast on Animax in Southeast Asia. The Bang Zoom!-produced dub has been released on Blu-ray + DVD Combo Pack with a limited edition on December 5, 2017, and the first season was broadcast on Adult Swim's Toonami programming block beginning on October 27, 2018. According to Jason DeMarco, Adult Swim executive producer, legal issues arose with the licensing of the second season at the time, as the Japanese version was licensed by Crunchyroll, and the English version was licensed by Funimation, and it prevented the second season from the airing on the block. At the time of the legal incident, both companies were not owned by a single conglomerate company. The third season would also not air on the block, mainly due in part to Crunchyroll's "unwillingness" to work with Adult Swim on syndication deals for most of their licensed catalog. The series was also streamed on HBO Max in the United States until August 3, 2022. Madman Entertainment imported Funimation's release in Australia and New Zealand, and Manga Entertainment distributed the series in the United Kingdom and Ireland.

Following a screening of three Bones films, attendees reported that Bones teased that progress was being made on a further Mob Psycho 100 anime project. In October 2017, an event anime titled  was revealed. It is a 60-minute compilation of the anime series and features new scenes focused on Arataka Reigen. The event anime was screened twice at the Maihama Amphitheater in Chiba on March 18, 2018, and was later released on home video. At the end of the event, a second season of the anime series was announced, with the staff and voice cast returning to reprise their roles. Mob Psycho 100 II aired from January 7 to April 1, 2019, with the series being simulcast on Crunchyroll. On April 18, 2019, Funimation and Crunchyroll confirmed that season two would simuldub on April 25. The opening theme for the second season is "99.9" by Mob Choir feat. sajou no hana.

Following the conclusion of the second season, another OVA was announced, with Yuzuru Tachikawa reprising his role as director.  The OVA, titled  was released on September 25, 2019. The second OVA episode premiered worldwide at Crunchyroll Expo 2019 on September 1, 2019. Simulcast streaming of the OVA episode on Crunchyroll began worldwide (except Asia) on September 25, 2019.

On October 19, 2021, it was announced that a third season was in production. Takahiro Hasui directed the season, with Yuzuru Tachikawa serving as chief director. The main cast and staff reprised their roles. Mob Psycho 100 III aired from October 6 to December 22, 2022. The opening theme is "1", and the ending theme is "Cobalt", both performed by Mob Choir.

The third season's simuldub was slated to be produced by Crunchyroll rather than Bang Zoom! with some roles recast, due to the choice to move dub production to in-person recording sessions at their Dallas based studio, rather than remote recordings, after largely relying on the latter at the start of the COVID-19 pandemic. Among the planned recastings was the voice of Mob, Kyle McCarley, who stated that he would likely not be reprising the role as Crunchyroll had refused to negotiate a potential union contract for future anime dubbing productions with McCarley's union SAG-AFTRA. McCarley had offered to work non-union on season 3 under the condition that Crunchyroll discuss with SAG-AFTRA, but as this did not proceed, McCarley will likely not return. This news prompted much criticism of Crunchyroll on social media.

Drama
A 12-episode Japanese television drama was broadcast on TV Tokyo's MokuDora 25 timeslot from January 18 to April 5, 2018.

Other media
A fanbook was published on November 17, 2022. It includes detailed information about the series, its characters, story and setting. It also features illustrations by various manga artists, including Hiromu Arakawa, Kotoyama, Takako Shimura, Nagano, Ryōji Minagawa and Itaru Bonnoki.

Reception

Manga
Mob Psycho 100 won the 62nd Shogakukan Manga Award in the shōnen category in 2017. As of July 2016, Mob Psycho 100 had over 1.2 million copies in circulation. The comic book writers of San Diego Comic-Con listed it as one of the "Most Wanted Manga" from 2016.

Critical reception
Ian Wolf from Anime UK News praised the first two volumes of the series, giving them 8 out of 10, and stated "One’s art is notable for a few reasons. The art is designed to be humorous rather than stylish. Part of the comedy value in One’s work is the rough styling that adds to the scenarios he creates. In this second volume of Mob Psycho 100, it is the action which is the main focus. There is some comedy thrown into the mix as well, but mainly this time it is about the battle between the two psychics and their different philosophies. It is also interesting to witness this fight because it is one in which one of the participants is trying their hardest not to fight, while the other is giving it all they’ve got. Having said this, there is still some comedy added to the heat of the battle, the main highlight being when Teru tries to use knives to beat Mob, but Mob deflects one of the knives away, accidentally cutting off a massive chunk of Teru’s hair. It is at times like this where One’s art style can sometimes fall down. His rough artwork does lead neatly to the chaotic scenes he is trying to depict at the height of the fight but when it comes to the more dramatic moments, the rough style lacks pathos. Here, the anime has the edge when it depicts the fight because other elements such as the music or the use of colour can add to the tension".

Anime
In the 1st Crunchyroll Anime Awards, the first season of the anime series received two awards: Best Action and Best Fight Scene (Shigeo vs. Koyama). It was also nominated in six other categories, including "Anime of the Year". At the 4th Crunchyroll Anime Awards in 2020, the second season of the anime also won two awards: Best Animation and Best Opening Sequence for "99.9" by Mob Choir feat. Sajou no Hana. It was also nominated in five other categories, including "Anime of the Year". Mob Psycho 100 was one of the Jury Recommended Works in the Animation Division at the 20th Japan Media Arts Festival in 2017. In November 2019, Polygon named Mob Psycho 100 as one of the best anime of the 2010s, and Crunchyroll listed it in their "Top 25 best anime of the 2010s". IGN also listed Mob Psycho 100 among the best anime series of the 2010s.

In September 2020, the series went viral after American businessman Eric Trump, son of then-President Donald Trump, published a tweet connecting the series to allegations of censorship by Google, due to Google Search results for "mob" showing Mob's face rather than a group of people.

Critical reception
Anime News Network listed the first season of Mob Psycho 100 among the best anime series of 2016. Nick Creamer praised the series' visual style, character story and its concepts of heroism and society also presented in ONE's other work One-Punch Man. Lauren Orsini commended the coming-of-age story of Mob and praised the series' animation and music. James Beckett of Anime News Network gave the second season an A+, and describes the series as "I don't know how else to put it: Mob Psycho 100 II is about as close to perfect a season of television as I can imagine. I am willing to bet that the series will go down as one of the best seasons of anime ever produced, and you owe it to yourself to experience it first-hand. A modern masterpiece of animation that needs to be seen to be believed".

Notes

References

External links
  
  
 

2010s webcomics
2012 manga
2012 webcomic debuts
2017 webcomic endings
2018 Japanese television series debuts
2018 Japanese television series endings
Action anime and manga
Action webcomics
Anime series based on manga
Bones (studio)
Comedy anime and manga
Coming-of-age anime and manga
Crunchyroll Anime Awards winners
Crunchyroll anime
Dark Horse Comics titles
Exorcism in anime and manga
Fiction about psychic powers
Fiction about spirit possession
Funimation
Ghosts in popular culture
Japanese comedy webcomics
Japanese-language Netflix original programming
School life in anime and manga
Shogakukan franchises
Shogakukan manga
Shōnen manga
Supernatural anime and manga
Television shows based on Japanese webcomics
Tokyo MX original programming
Toonami
TV Asahi original programming
TV Tokyo original programming
Warner Entertainment Japan franchises
Winners of the Shogakukan Manga Award for shōnen manga